Harvey Ray Farmer (born July 1, 1974) is an American football executive and former linebacker who is a scouting consultant for the Los Angeles Rams of the National Football League (NFL). He is the former general manager of the Cleveland Browns, having served in that role from 2014 to 2015. Farmer has also previously served with the Kansas City Chiefs and Atlanta Falcons in their scouting departments.

Playing career
Farmer played free safety at Duke University from 1992 to 1996. He was all-Atlantic Coast Conference (ACC) twice, and as a senior, he led the team in tackles with 111 and played in two collegiate all-star games. After graduation with a degree in sociology, he was drafted by the Philadelphia Eagles in the fourth round of the 1996 draft, and played three seasons at linebacker. His career was ended by a knee injury.

Executive career

Early career
From 1998 to 2000, Farmer worked in TV and radio before being hired as an academic coordinator at Duke University.
he was the academic coordinator for football at Duke University in 2001.

Atlanta Falcons
In 2002, Farmer was hired by the Atlanta Falcons as a scout. He would serve in that position until 2005.

Kansas City Chiefs
In 2006, Farmer was hired by the Kansas City Chiefs to serve as their director of pro personnel.

Cleveland Browns
In 2013, Farmer was hired by the Cleveland Browns as their assistant general manager. In 2014, Farmer was promoted to general manager of the Browns, replacing Mike Lombardi.

In February 2015, the Northeast Ohio Media Group reported that Farmer was under investigation for sending texts to coaching staff discussing play-calling during games, which violated the league's electronic device policy. Farmer was eventually suspended in March 2015 for the first four games of the 2015 regular season without pay, and the team was fined $250,000.

On January 3, 2016, after Cleveland's final game of the season, Farmer was fired.

Los Angeles Rams
In 2020, Farmer was hired by the Los Angeles Rams as a scouting consultant.

References

1974 births
Living people
American football linebackers
American football safeties
Cleveland Browns executives
Duke Blue Devils football players
Kansas City Chiefs executives
Philadelphia Eagles players
People from White Plains, New York
Sportspeople from Westchester County, New York
Players of American football from New York (state)

Atlanta Falcons scouts 
Los Angeles Rams scouts